Asaka Station is the name of two train stations in Japan:

 Asaka Station (Osaka) (浅香駅)
 Asaka Station (Saitama) (朝霞駅)